Craig Lewis Hanneman (born July 1, 1949) is a former American football player who played in the National Football League (NFL) from 1972 to 1975.  He played in college for Oregon State University and played for two NFL teams in 52 games over 4 seasons. 

Following his NFL career, Hanneman returned to Oregon where he worked as the Government Affairs Manager for Willamette Industries and later as the President of the Oregon Forest Industries Council. Hanneman also served as a Polk County Commissioner.

In 2012, Hanneman climbed Mount Everest. He is believed to be the first former NFL, NBA or major league athlete to reach the summit of the world's tallest mountain.

In 2019, three years after being diagnosed with ALS, he completed the Seven Summits at age 70.

In 2020, Hanneman was inducted into the State of Oregon Sports Hall of Fame.

References

1949 births
American football defensive ends
American football defensive tackles
County commissioners in Oregon
Living people
New England Patriots players
Oregon State Beavers football players
Pittsburgh Steelers players
Sportspeople from Salem, Oregon
South Salem High School alumni
Summiters of the Seven Summits